Mark Ward may refer to:
 Mark Ward (footballer, born 1962), English footballer
 Mark Ward (footballer, born 1982), English footballer
 Mark Ward (Gaelic footballer) (born 1985), football player from Ireland
 Mark Ward (politician) (born 1974), Sinn Féin TD for Dublin Mid-West
 Mark Ward (theologian), American theologian
 Mark Ward, editor of Birds, the magazine of the Royal Society for the Protection of Birds